Goldfeld may refer to:

Places
 Goldfield, Nevada, ghost town in Nevada, USA
 Goldfield Hotel in Goldfield, Nevada, was added to the Nevada State Register of Historic Places and was part of the scenery of many Ghost TV shows and movies

Other uses
 Goldfeld (surname), people with the surname Goldfeld

See also
 Goldfeld–Quandt test
 Anshel–Anshel–Goldfeld key exchange